The warning track is the part of the baseball field that is closest to the wall or fence and is made of a different material than the field. Common materials for the warning track include dirt or rubber; it should always be of a different material than the playing field. The change of terrain serves as a "warning" for fielders trying to make a deep catch that they are running out of room, since it is often difficult for the fielder to keep his eye on a fly ball while keeping track of his position relative to the wall. It runs parallel to the ballpark's outfield wall.  The track can also be utilized by vehicles on grass fields, thus preserving the playing field.

Despite the warning track's presence, it is common to see outfielders crash into the wall to make a catch, due to a desire to field the play regardless of the outcome, because they fail to register the warning in time, as they are looking up at the fly ball, or because they don't know how many steps they'll have on the track.

The "track" part of the term comes from Old Yankee Stadium, where an actual running track was built for the use of track and field events. In 1949 Major League Baseball formally began requiring a warning track. There still are professional fields without a proper warning track, however, such as Tropicana Field, which uses brown-colored turf. Rogers Centre, home of the Toronto Blue Jays, also has no warning track, a holdover from the days when the Argonauts played at the stadium (requiring frequent conversions from baseball to football configuration).

The width of warning tracks can vary by rules and level of play. In general it is designed to give fielders three steps of warning before the outfield wall.

References

Baseball field